Save-On-Foods is a chain of supermarkets located across Western Canada, owned by the Pattison Food Group.

Stores carry both standard brands and private label brands, such as Western Family. Many stores have a pharmacy, and some locations provide other services, including nutrition tours and health clinics, as well as other features such as Starbucks Coffee kiosks, juice bars, and departments featuring BC wines. Today, Save-On-Foods operates 177 stores across British Columbia, Alberta, Saskatchewan, Manitoba and the Yukon Territory.

History
The Save-On-Foods brand was launched in British Columbia in 1982 by Overwaitea Foods, which had been founded in 1915 and was later purchased by Jimmy Pattison in 1968. Most Overwaitea branded stores were gradually converted to Save-On-Foods stores beginning in the 1980s, with the last two remaining Overwaitea stores switching in 2018.

The first Save-On-Foods store in Alberta opened in 1990 in Edmonton. The store's loyalty card was launched in May 1992 as the Save-On-More card, but later rebranded as More Rewards. 

Save-On-Foods is also the namesake company of the Save-On-Foods Memorial Centre Arena in Victoria, British Columbia. In 2004, the Jim Pattison Group agreed to pay $125,000 per year for 10 years for the Save-On-Foods name rights on Victoria’s new arena, amidst unpopular public opinion.

In February 2014, the company announced it was taking over 14 stores on Vancouver Island owned by Sobeys, mostly under the Safeway and Thrifty Foods banners. It was also announced that Overwaitea would convert 11 of its PriceSmart Foods locations to the Save-On-Foods brand.

Until 2015, Save-On-Foods operated exclusively in the provinces of British Columbia and Alberta. In July 2015, the company revealed it was planning to open as many as 40 stores in Manitoba and Saskatchewan over the following three to five years, the first of which was scheduled to open in 2016, including three locations in Winnipeg and four in Saskatchewan.

In March 2016, it was announced that Save-On-Foods would also expand to northern Canada opening up a store in Whitehorse, Yukon in 2017.

In 2017, Save-On-Foods began carrying private label products from UK grocery chain Tesco. This arrangement ended in early 2019.

Locations

Alberta
42 locations:

Airdrie (2)
Calgary (8)
Camrose
Canmore
Cochrane
Edmonton (15)
Fort McMurray (3)
Grande Prairie 
Lethbridge (2)
Medicine Hat
Okotoks
Red Deer (2)
Sherwood Park (3)
St. Albert (2)
Spruce Grove

British Columbia
110 locations:

100 Mile House
Abbotsford (3)
Aldergrove
Burnaby (5)
Burns Lake
Campbell River
Chilliwack (4)
Cloverdale
Coquitlam (2)
Cranbrook
Creston
Delta (3)
Duncan
Fernie
Fort St. James
Fort St. John
Golden
Grand Forks
Hope
Kamloops (5)
Kelowna (4)
Kimberley
Kitimat
Ladysmith
Langford
Langley (3)
Maple Ridge (3)
Merritt
Mission
Nakusp
Nanaimo (3)
Nelson
New Westminster (3)
North Vancouver (city)/(district) (4)
Parksville
Penticton
Pitt Meadows
Port Alberni
Port Coquitlam (2)
Port Hardy
Powell River
Prince George (4)
Prince Rupert
Princeton
Quesnel
Revelstoke
Richmond (3)
Saanich
Salmon Arm
Sidney
Sparwood
Squamish
Surrey (7)
Terrace
Vancouver (8)
Vernon (2)
Victoria (4)
West Kelowna
Williams Lake
Winfield

Manitoba
5 locations:

Winnipeg (5)

Saskatchewan
7 locations:

Prince Albert
Regina (2)
Saskatoon (3)
Yorkton

Yukon
1 location:

Whitehorse

See also
List of supermarket chains in Canada
Station Square collapse
Urban Fair

References

External links
Official website

Jim Pattison Group
Supermarkets of Canada
Canadian brands
Retail companies established in 1982
Online grocers
Online retailers of Canada
Cuisine of Western Canada
Food and drink companies based in British Columbia